Nikos "Nick" Salapatas (born 17 November 1989) is a British-Greek footballer who plays for Bishop's Stortford in the Conference South in England.

Education 

Salapatas obtained his BSc in Sports Science in October 2012 at Brunel University in London.

Early career 

He spent his early years from U12s - U16s at Chelsea Academy. Then he was transferred to Olympiakos on a 3-year contract where he was a regular for the Reserve team. After spending a year there he decided to play for Luton Town where he featured in their Youth/Reserve teams.

Playing career 

He started playing First team football for Wealdstone and later on Harrow Borough. During his University time he signed with Conference Premier side Stevenage in January 2010, which was the year Stevenage won the League. 
After spending two seasons training with Danny Bailey's Elite Academy and playing for his team Interwood, he joined Greek Football League 2 giants Paniliakos, under Greek manager Stelios Giannakopoulos. He was a regular in the team and with mainly his assists helped his team to get promoted to the Greek Football League.
Next season he joined Athens-based Greek Football League 2 side Doxa Vyronas.
After spending a year with Doxa, he moved to England and joined Harrow Borough, where he stayed for the first half of the season 2014–2015. In January 2015, he signed with Conference South side, Bishop's Stortford.

Honours 

 Paniliakos
 Promotion to Greek Football League: 2013

  Bishop's Stortford
 Herts Charity Cup Winners: 2015

References

External links 
 
 
 Nikos Salapatas at SoccerPunter.com

Welsh footballers
British people of Greek descent
1989 births
Living people
Association football midfielders
Doxa Vyronas F.C. players